The Cascapédia River is a river in the Gaspé Peninsula of Quebec, Canada, which has its source at Lake Cascapedia, fed by streams of the Chic-Choc Mountains, and empties into Cascapedia Bay (Baie de la Cascapédia), a small bay of Chaleur Bay. At times, it is also called Grand Cascapédia River to differentiate it from the Little Cascapédia River which empties into the same bay just to the east.

The Cascapedia is known for its Atlantic salmon (salmo salar) fishing. Already back in 1835, surveyor Joseph Hamel noted the abundance of fish, including trout, salmon, carp, and whitefish. Several Governors General of Canada, including The Marquess of Lansdowne and Lord Stanley, had summer homes along this river.

Almost its entire course is protected in the Cascapedia River Wildlife Reserve (réserve faunique de la Rivière-Cascapédia), established in 1982. Its headwaters and Lake Cascapedia are within the Gaspésie National Park.

Etymology
Its name comes from the Mi'kmaq word gesgapegiag, meaning "strong current" or "large river". It was first documented on a map by Jean-Baptiste-Louis Franquelin in 1686 as Kichkabeguiak, and appeared as Kaskabijack on a map of 1783. By 1863 Stanislas Drapeau used the current spelling.

Geography
The Cascapédia River is entirely undammed and wild, and no municipality is using it for its wastewater. Because its source is the Chic Choc Mountains that are largely made up of soluble limestone, its waters are rich in carbonates and low in sulfates and chlorides, with a higher conductivity and pH level than typical water of the Canadian Shield. The lack of agriculture and industry keep the river free from pollution. Its water is rated of the highest quality.

The Cascapedia basin is also mostly undeveloped with less than  under cultivation. Logging is more important: 8 percent of the basin area was harvested between 1988 and 1994.

Tributaries
The significant tributaries of the Cascapédia River are (in upstream order):
 Ruisseau Blanc (White Brook)
 Ruisseau de la Truite (Trout Brook)
 Angers River
 Ruisseau Grand Nord (Big North Brook)
 Argument Creek
 “Rousseau Joshué” (Joshua’s Brook)
 Square Forks River
 Berry Brook
 Branche du Lac (Lake Branch)
 Ruisseau de l'Échouement (Go Ashore Brook)
 Ruisseau de Mineurs (Miners Brook)
 Ruisseau de l'Inlet (Inlet Brook)
 Brandy Brook
 Indian Brook
 Ruisseau du Dix-Septième Mille (Seventeen Mile Brook)
 Ruisseau aux Saumons (Salmon Branch)
 Lake Branch

See also
List of rivers of Quebec

References

External links
Cascapedia Museum

Rivers of Gaspésie–Îles-de-la-Madeleine
Gaspé Peninsula